Christopher Shaun Bushing (born November 4, 1967) is a retired Major League Baseball pitcher. He played during one season at the major league level for the Cincinnati Reds. He was signed by the Baltimore Orioles as an amateur free agent in 1986. Bushing played his first professional season with their Rookie league Bluefield Orioles in 1986, and his last with the Texas Rangers' Triple-A Oklahoma City 89ers in 1995.

References
"Chris Bushing Statistics". The Baseball Cube. 22 January 2008.
"Chris Bushing Statistics". Baseball-Reference. 22 January 2008.

External links

1967 births
Living people
Cincinnati Reds players
Major League Baseball pitchers
Baseball players from New York (state)
Nashville Sounds players
Bluefield Orioles players
Harrisburg Senators players
Rockford Expos players
Reading Phillies players
Peninsula Pilots players
Chattanooga Lookouts players
West Palm Beach Expos players
Oklahoma City 89ers players
People from Rockville Centre, New York
Bushing, Chris